Ciechocinek (Polish pronunciation: ; German (1941-1945): Hermannsbad) is a spa town in Kuyavian-Pomeranian Voivodeship, north-central Poland, located on the Vistula River about  east of Aleksandrów Kujawski and  south-east of the city of Toruń. It is located within the historic region of Kuyavia. As of December 2021, the town has a population of 10,442.

Ciechocinek is known for its unique 'saline graduation towers'. 
Experts have considered the local saline springs to be of extreme value and named the thermal spring no. 14 "a wonder of nature". The therapeutic qualities of these springs are directed toward curing cardiovascular, respiratory, orthopedic, traumatic, rheumatic, nervous system and women's diseases.

History

The history of Ciechocinek dates back to the Middle Ages. It belonged to the Kingdom of Poland until the Second Partition of Poland in 1793, when it was annexed by Prussia. It 1807 it became part of the short-lived Polish Duchy of Warsaw, and in 1815 it became part of Congress Poland, initially autonomous within the Russian Empire, from 1844 on as part of the Warsaw Governorate. When Wieliczka and Bochnia, towns rich in salt deposits, fell in the First Partition of Poland to Austria, the salt resources of Ciechocinek and nearby Słońsk drew the attention of Polish officials. On the initiative of Stanisław Staszic, a salt extraction project was created. The development of the spa plant and health resort in Ciechocinek dates back to 1836. In 1867 Ciechocinek gained a railway connection with Bydgoszcz and Warsaw. The rapid development and popularity among guests from home and abroad contributed to the granting of town rights in 1916.

After Poland regained independence after World War I in 1918, the spa was taken over by the Polish Government and subordinated to the Ministry of Health. During this period, healing facilities destroyed during the war were rebuilt, new pensions, a post office, school, a residential and commercial complex, the President's Manor House and other facilities were built. The Health Park was also created, consisting of a thermal-saline pool, the Jordan Garden, a sports field and vast green areas surrounding the graduation towers.

Following the invasion of Poland at the beginning of the Second World War, Ciechocinek was occupied by Nazi Germany on 12 September 1939 and on 26 September incorporated into the Reichsgau Wartheland as part of the district/county (kreis) of Hermannsbad (1941-1945). The Polish population was subjected to various crimes including mass arrests, murder and expulsions. During the German invasion, in September 1939, the Wehrmacht and Selbstschutz murdered some inhabitants of Ciechocinek in the nearby village of Koneck, and from October 1939 to January 1940, the Germans carried out massacres of many Poles from Ciechocinek in the nearby Odolion forest (see Nazi crimes against the Polish nation). In addition, in 1939 and 1940, Germans expelled approximately 640 Poles, especially the intelligentsia and owners of shops, workshops and offices, which were then handed over to German colonists as part of the Lebensraum policy. During the occupation the town functioned as a military hospital for German troops and also as a health resort, only for German citizens. The town was liberated from occupation in January 1945. Luckily it avoided significant damage.

In early 2018, a Tesla Supercharger opened, making it the fourth opened in Poland.

Sports
The local football club is Zdrój Ciechocinek. It competes in the lower leagues.

Gallery

See also 
 St. Michael the Archangel Church, Ciechocinek

References

External links

 Graduation towers in Ciechocinek - puzzle
 Photo gallery - Ciechocinek
 Elektronic Press Pomorska.pl
 

Cities and towns in Kuyavian-Pomeranian Voivodeship
Aleksandrów County
Warsaw Governorate
Warsaw Voivodeship (1919–1939)
Pomeranian Voivodeship (1919–1939)
Spa towns in Poland